Claroscura is the eighth studio album by Colombian band Aterciopelados, released in 2018. It marks the band's return after nine years since their previous studio album. Production duties were shared by Héctor Buitrago and Argentine producer Cachorro Lopez in Groove Studios in Bogotá, while the mastering was done by the engineer Emily Lazar in The Lodge Studio L.A.

The first single from the album was the Ana Tijoux collaboration, "Play", released on April 12, 2018. Several lyrics of the album are focused on female empowerment as well as topics that have been frequented by the group in previous albums such as the environment and spirituality. They received a Latin Grammy Award for Best Alternative Music Album, making it their third Latin Grammy and were also nominated in the category of Best Alternative Song for the song "Dúo".

Track listing

Personnel

Aterciopelados
 Andrea Echeverri – vocals, rhythm guitar
 Héctor Buitrago – bass, backing vocals

Additional musicians
 Ana Tijoux – backing vocals
 Jorge Celedón – backing vocals

References

2018 albums
Aterciopelados albums